This company was formed by a small group of technology and financial professionals for simplifying the payment processing system. AccessPay is a Bacs approved software provider, offering a range of payments and cash management products like Direct Debit, SEPA, Faster Payments, SWIFT and Multi-Bank Cash Management.

History 
AccessPay was founded by Ali Moiyed. Ali previously developed Primalink, a SaaS consultancy.

AccessPay launched a payment and cash management application with SWIFT in the cloud in Oct, 2013. Ali Moiyed sought clarity for UK corporates affected by the 6 months SEPA (Single Euro Payment Area) deadline extension in Feb, 2014. In March 2014 AccessPay announced a new strategic partnership with Global Reach Partner for cross border payments. In August 2017, AccessPay appointed James Higgins as product director.

Certification
AccessPay received ISO 27001 certificate from the British Assessment Bureau in Oct, 2013.

References

External links
Official Website
RHY Global Site

Financial software companies